Two ships of the Bangladesh Navy carried the name BNS Durjoy:
 , a Type 037-class submarine chaser damaged in 1995.
 , a  large patrol craft currently in service.

Bangladesh Navy ship names